The Tunisian Pirate Party is a small political party in Tunisia. It was formed in 2010 and legalised on 12 March 2012, becoming one of the first outgrowths of the Pirate Party movement in both the Arab World & Africa.

The party achieved notoriety during the Tunisian revolution, as party members declared their intention to break a media blackout on the social unrest taking place across the country. Members distributed censorship circumvention software, and assisted in documenting human rights abuses during the riots in the cities of Sidi Bouzid, Siliana, and Thala.

After the revolution, a Pirate Party member who had been detained during the unrest, Slim Amamou, was briefly selected as Secretary of State for Sport and Youth in the new government. He later resigned in protest of the transitional government's censorship of several websites at the request of the army.

References

 
2010 establishments in Tunisia
Intellectual property activism
Pirate parties
Political parties established in 2010
Political parties in Tunisia